Philip Burgers is an American writer, comedy performer, director and clown teacher. He is best known for his character Dr Brown.

Career
Burgers began his career in 2007 following training at the French clown school Ecole Philippe Gaulier.

His most notable success to date is with the character Dr Brown. Dr Brown is a physical character based in an absurd world. Burgers took Dr Brown Because and Dr Brown Becaves around the world from 2009 - 2011 including Prague Fringe, Hong Kong Microfest, Australia. Since 2011, he has continued with Dr Brown in the family shows with Stuart Bowden The Dr Brown Brown Brown Brown Brown and his Singing Tiger and Dr Brown Brown Brown Brown Brown and his Singing Tiger Again the former won Best Children's Presentation at the Adelaide Fringe Festival and the Director's Choice at the Melbourne International Comedy Festival in 2012 and Dr Brown Befrdfgth which won the BARRY award for the Best Show at Melbourne International Comedy Festival in 2012 and the Total Theatre Award for 'Innovation', the latter of which he won the Best Show by Foster's Edinburgh Comedy Award. Burgers has also performed in  Comedy Blaps sketches for Channel 4. The Blaps was co-written with Andrew Gaynord and its pilot episode will air on Channel 4.

In 2016 he wrote and starred in his own 30-minute episode of the sketch show Netflix Presents: The Characters.

In 2018, he starred in the silent short film The Passage, which premiered at Sundance. From 2020, he appeared as recurring character Phil in Mae Martin's sitcom Feel Good.

Filmography

References

American male comedians
American writers
Living people
Year of birth missing (living people)
Place of birth missing (living people)